The 1991 season is the 5th season of the league that began on December 29, 1990, and concluded with the championship game on April 6, 1991.

Team movement
No teams were added, removed, or relocated in the 1991 season.  However, the MILL did divide the six teams into two divisions: Detroit, Pittsburgh, and New England comprised the National Division, and the American Division was Baltimore, New York, and Philadelphia.

Regular season

All Star Game
The first-ever MILL All-Star Game was held at the Spectrum in Philadelphia during the 1991 season. The National Division defeated the American Division 25-20.

Playoffs

Championship
Detroit 14 @ Baltimore 12

Awards

All-Pro Teams
First Team:
John Conley, Philadelphia
Gary Gait, Detroit
Paul Gait, Detroit
Rick Sowell, Baltimore
John Tucker, Philadelphia
Ted Sawicki, Detroit (goalie)

Second Team:
Jeff Jackson, Baltimore
Butch Marino, Pittsburgh
Mike Cummings, New York
John Nostrant, Philadelphia
Brian Nikula, Pittsburgh
Sal LoCascio, New York (goalie)

Statistics leaders
Bold numbers indicate new single-season records. Italics indicate tied single-season records.

See also
 1991 in sports

References
1991 Archive at the Outsider's Guide to the NLL

Lacrosse
Major Indoor Lacrosse League seasons